The Wachusett Reservoir is the second largest body of water in the state of Massachusetts. It is located in central Massachusetts, northeast of Worcester. It is part of the water supply system for metropolitan Boston maintained by the Massachusetts Water Resources Authority (MWRA). Water from the reservoir flows to the covered Norumbega Storage Facility via the Cosgrove Tunnel and the MetroWest Water Supply Tunnel.

The reservoir serves as both an intermediate storage reservoir for water from the Quabbin Reservoir, and a water source itself, fed by its own watershed. The reservoir is fed by the Quinapoxet and Stillwater rivers, along with the Quabbin Aqueduct, which carries water from the Quabbin Reservoir. It is part of the Nashua River watershed, forming the headwaters of the river. Because it is an intermediate storage reservoir, its water levels are kept relatively constant while the Quabbin Reservoir fluctuates based on precipitation and demand. At times when the Wachusett Reservoir becomes high due to its own watershed producing a large amount of runoff such as during snow melting, the flow from the Quabbin is shut off and water from the Ware River flows backwards down the Quabbin Aqueduct into the Quabbin Reservoir for storage.

History 
In 1897, the Nashua River above the town of Clinton was impounded by the Wachusett Dam;  were flooded in the towns of Boylston, West Boylston, Clinton, and Sterling. Its water was originally delivered to the Sudbury Reservoir via the Wachusett Aqueduct, with the Cosgrove Tunnel (completed in 1965) providing redundancy. Interconnections at the Sudbury Reservoir eventually delivered the water to the Weston Reservoir via the Weston Aqueduct; these downstream facilities were relegated to backup roles in the late 20th and early 21st century by the construction of the MetroWest Water Supply Tunnel and covered storage facilities.

West Boylston's prominent landmark—the Old Stone Church—was left remaining as a reminder of those who lost their homes and jobs to the building of the reservoir. It is one of the most photographed sites in the area.

When it was built, the Wachusett Reservoir was the largest public water supply reservoir in the world and the largest body of water in Massachusetts. It has since been surpassed by the Quabbin Reservoir (see that article for a history of reservoir building in Massachusetts).

Recreation and fishing 
Because the reservoir is the water supply for Boston, not all areas around it are open to the public. Regulations designed to ensure pure water include the prohibition of boats, ice fishing, wading, swimming, overnight camping, alcoholic beverages, littering, animals, bikes, and motor vehicles from the reservoir and abutting property. These regulations are controversial to recreation and fishing proponents, who argue the rules are not needed to protect water quality. A network of fire roads provides easy access for hikers and cross-country skiers.

In 1999, the reservoir contained twelve native and twelve introduced species of fish. The limited access, combined with abundant, high-quality habitat, produced state records for brown trout, land-locked salmon, smallmouth bass, and white perch. The Wachusett Reservoir is one of only two locations in Massachusetts to support lake trout, a North American native trout species which has been known to reach 20 plus pounds in Reservoir. In addition stocked rainbow trout are known to "holdover" (live through multiple summers) in Wachusett. Rainbow smelt are also present although their numbers are greatly reduced when compared to many years ago. Lake trout are a major draw to fishermen and women. 

Approximately 80% of the  shoreline is usually open to angling from April 1 through November 30, depending on ice conditions.

Image gallery

References

Further reading 
 McCarthy Earls, Eamon. Wachusett: How Boston's 19th Century Quest for Water Changed Four Towns and a Way of Life. Franklin, Massachusetts: Via Appia Press (www.viaappiapress.com), 2010.

External links 

 Wachusett Reservoir, Massachusetts Department of Conservation and Recreation 
 Wachusett Reservoir History, Massachusetts Water Resources Authority
 Historic Photos, MIT Institute Archives & Special Collections
 Massachusetts Metropolitan Water Works Photograph Collection, 1876–1930 documents the construction of the Boston metropolitan water supply as it expanded westward between 1876 and 1925.
 Mass Central Rail Trail, rails-to-trails conversion on the Central Mass line, which was rerouted during dam construction
 Court order and statement of facts about MWRA facilities
 DCR map and information

Reservoirs in Massachusetts
Lakes of Worcester County, Massachusetts
Buildings and structures in Worcester County, Massachusetts
Protected areas of Worcester County, Massachusetts
1908 establishments in Massachusetts